The Parmeliaceae is a large and diverse family of Lecanoromycetes. With over 2700 species in 71 genera, it is the largest family of lichen-forming fungi. The most speciose genera in the family are the well-known groups: Xanthoparmelia (822 species),  Usnea (355 species), Parmotrema (255 species), and Hypotrachyna (262 species).

Nearly all members of the family have a symbiotic association with a green alga (most often Trebouxia spp., but Asterochloris spp. are known to associate with some species). The majority of Parmeliaceae species have a foliose, fruticose, or subfruticose growth form.  The morphological diversity and complexity exhibited by this group is enormous, and many specimens are exceedingly difficult to identify down to the species level.

The family has a cosmopolitan distribution, and is present in a wide range of habitats and climatic regions. This includes everywhere from roadside pavement to alpine rocks, from tropical rainforest trees to subshrubs in the Arctic tundra. Members of the Parmeliaceae are found in most terrestrial environments. Several Parmeliaceae species have been assessed for the global IUCN Red List.

Taxonomy
Based on several molecular phylogenetic studies, the Parmeliaceae as currently circumscribed has been shown to be a monophyletic group. This circumscription is inclusive of the previously described families Alectoriaceae, Anziaceae, Hypogymniaceae, and Usneaceae, which are all no longer recognised by most lichen systematists. However, despite the family being one of the most thoroughly studied groups of lichens, several relationships within the family still remain unclear. Phylogenetic analysis supports the existence of seven distinct clades in the family. The Parmelioid clade is the largest, containing 27 genera and about 1850 species – about two-thirds of the species in the family.

Alectorioid clade (5 genera)
Cetrarioid clade (17 genera)
Hypogymnioid clade (4 genera)
Letharioid clade (2 genera)
Parmelioid clade (27 genera)
Psiloparmelioid clade (2 genera)
Usneoid clade (1 genus)

Many Parmeliaceae genera do not group phylogenetically into any of these clades, and these, along with genera that have not yet had their DNA studied, are classed as "genera with uncertain affinities".

The Parmeliaceae has been divided into two subfamilies, Protoparmelioideae and Parmelioideae. The diversification of various Parmelioideae lineages may have been a result of gaining innovations that provided adaptive advantages, such as melanin production in the genus Melanohalea. Diversification of the Protoparmelioideae occurred during the Miocene. The Parmelioid clade is the largest in the Parmeliaceae, with more than 1800 species and a centre of distribution in the Southern Hemisphere.

Evolutionary history
Although fossil records of extant lichen species are scarce, the existence of some amber inclusions has allowed for a rough estimate of the divergence of the Parmeliaceae from its most recent common ancestor. An Anzia inclusion from 35–40 Myr-old Baltic amber and Parmelia from 15–45 Myr-old Dominican amber suggest a minimum age estimate for the Parmeliaceae of about 40 Myr. A fossil-calibrated phylogeny has estimated the Parmeliaceae to have diversified much earlier, around the Cretaceous–Paleogene boundary, 58–74 Myr ago.

Characteristics

Thallus
Parmeliaceae thalli are most often foliose, fruticose or subfruticose, but can be umblicate, peltate, caespitose, crustose, or subcrustose.  Two genera, Nesolechia and Raesaenenia, contain lichenicolous fungi. They can be a variety of colours, from whitish to grey, green to yellow, or brown to blackish (or any combination therein). Many genera are lobe forming, and nearly all are heteromerous (which are corticate on both sides).  Species are usually rhizinate on the lower surface, occasionally with holdfasts, rhizohyphae, or a hypothallus.  Only a few genera have a naked lower surface (for example Usnea, Hypogymnia and Menegazzia). The upper surface has a pored or non-pored epicortex. Medulla is solid, but often loosely woven.

Apothecia
Apothecia are lecanorine, produced along the lamina or margin, and sessile to pedicellate (or less often sunken). Thalline exciple is concolorous with the thallus.  Asci are amyloid, and the vast majority of species have eight spores per ascus, though a few species are many-spored, and several Menegazzia species have two spores per ascus.

Spores
Ascospores are simple, hyaline, and often small. Conidia generally arise laterally from the joints of conidiogenous hyphae (Parmelia-type), but arise terminally from these joints in a small number of species (Psora-type). The conidia can have a broad range of shapes: cylindrical to bacilliform, bifusiform, fusiform, sublageniform, unciform, filiform, or curved. Pycnidia are immersed or rarely emergent from the upper cortex, are produced along the lamina or margins, pyriform in shape, and dark-brown to black in colour.

Chemistry
Members of the Parmeliaceae exhibit a diverse chemistry, with several types of lichenan (Xanthoparmelia-type, Cetraria-type, intermediate-type), isolichenan and/or other polysaccharides being known from the cell walls of many species. The wide diversity in the types of chemical compounds includes depsides, depsidones, aliphatic acids, triterpenes, anthraquinones, secalonic acids, pulvinic acid derivatives, and xanthones. The compounds usnic acid and atranorin, which are found exclusively in the Parmeliaceae, are of great importance in the systematics of the family, and the presence or absence of these chemicals have been used in several instances to help define genera. Parmelia and Usnea are the best chemically characterized genera, while the species Cetraria islandica and Evernia prunastri have attracted considerable research attention for their bioactive compounds.

A study of three parmelioid lichens (Bulbothrix setschwanensis, Hypotrachyna cirrhata, and Parmotrema reticulatum) collected from high-altitude areas of Garhwal Himalaya, showed considerable variation in the chemical content with the rising altitude. This suggests that there is a prominent role for secondary metabolites in the wider ecological distribution of Parmelioid lichens at higher altitudes.

Photobiont
The main photobiont genus that associates with Parmeliaceae species is the chlorophyte Trebouxia. In particular, the species Trebouxia jamesii appears to be especially prominent. Some Parmeliaceae genera are also known to associate with Asterochloris, but the frequency of this association is not yet known. In general, photobiont diversity within the Parmeliaceae is a little studied subject, and much is left to discover here.

Genera

These are the genera that are in the Parmeliaceae (including estimated number of species in each genus). Following the genus name is the taxonomic authority (those who first circumscribed the genus; standardised author abbreviations are used), year of publication, and the estimated number of species.

 Ahtiana  – 1 sp.
 Alectoria  – 9 spp.
 Allantoparmelia  – 3 spp.
 Allocetraria  – 12 spp.
 Anzia  – 34 spp.
 Arctocetraria 
 Arctoparmelia  – 5 spp.
 Asahinea  – 2 spp.
 Austromelanelixia  – 5 spp.
 Austroparmelina  – 13 spp.
 Brodoa  – 3 spp.
 Bryocaulon  – 4 spp.
 Bryoria 
 Bulbothrix  – 62
 Canoparmelia  – 35 spp.
 Cetraria  – 35 spp.
 Cetrariella  – 3 spp.
 Cetrariopsis  – 3 spp.
 Cetrelia  – 19 spp.
 Coelopogon  – 2 spp.
 Cornicularia  – 1 sp.
 Crespoa  – 5 spp.
 Dactylina  – 2 spp.
 Davidgallowaya  – 1 sp.
 Dolichousnea  – 3 spp.
 Emodomelanelia  – 1 sp.
 Esslingeriana  – 1 sp.
 Evernia  – 10 spp.
 Everniopsis  – 1 sp.
 Flavocetraria  – 2 spp.
 Flavocetrariella 
 Flavoparmelia  – 32 spp.
 Flavopunctelia  – 5 spp.
 Gowardia  – 3 spp.
 Himantormia  – 2 spp.
 Hypogymnia  – 90 spp.
 Hypotrachyna  – 262 spp.
 Imshaugia  – 1 sp.
 Kaernefeltia  – 3 spp.
 Letharia  – 9 spp.
 Lethariella  – 11 spp.
 Maronina  – 3 spp.
 Masonhalea  – 2 spp.
 Melanelia  – 2 spp.
 Melanelixia  – 11 spp.
 Melanohalea  – 22 spp.
 Menegazzia  – 70 spp.
 Montanelia  – 5 spp.
 Myelochroa  – 30 spp.
 Neoprotoparmelia  – 14 spp.
 Nephromopsis  – 62 spp.?
 Nesolechia  – 2 spp.
 Nipponoparmelia  – 4 spp.
 Nodobryoria  – 3 spp.
 Notoparmelia  – 16 spp.
 Omphalodium  – 4 spp.
 Omphalora  – 1 sp.
 Oropogon  – 42 spp.
 Pannoparmelia  – 5 spp.
 Parmelia  – 43 spp.
 Parmelina  – 10 spp.
 Parmelinella  – 8 spp.
 Parmeliopsis  – 3 spp.
 Parmotrema  – 255 spp.
 Parmotremopsis  – 2 spp
 Phacopsis  – 10 spp.
 Platismatia  – 11 spp.
 Pleurosticta  – 2 spp.
 Protoparmelia  – 11 spp.
 Protousnea  – 8 spp.
 Pseudephebe  – 2 spp.
 Pseudevernia  – 4 spp.
 Pseudoparmelia  – 15 spp.
 Psiloparmelia  – 13 spp.
 Punctelia  – 48 spp.
 Relicina  – 59 spp.
 Remototrachyna  – 19 spp.
 Raesaenenia  – 1 sp.
 Sulcaria  – 5 spp.
 Tuckermanella  – 7 spp.
 Tuckermannopsis  – 12 spp.
 Tuckneraria  – 3 spp.
 Usnea  – 355 spp.
 Usnocetraria  – 2 spp.
 Vulpicida  – 6 spp.
 Xanthoparmelia  – 822 spp.

Conservation
Parmeliaceae species that have been assessed for the global IUCN Red List include the following: Anzia centrifuga (vulnerable, 2014); Sulcaria badia (endangered, 2019); Lethariella togashii (vulnerable, 2017); Hypotrachyna virginica (critically endangered, 2020); Sulcaria isidiifera (critically endangered, 2017); Sulcaria spiralifera (endangered, 2020); and Xanthoparmelia beccae (vulnerable, 2017).

Image gallery

References

 
Lichen families
Lecanoromycetes families
Taxa named by Jonathan Carl Zenker
Taxa described in 1827